Orcus is a genus of lady beetles in the family Coccinellidae. There are at least 18 described species in Orcus, found in Australia, New Guinea, New Caledonia, Java, Sumba, and the Kai Islands.

Species
These 18 species belong to the genus Orcus:

 Orcus artensis Crotch, 1874 (New Caledonia)
 Orcus australasiae (Boisduval, 1835) (Australia)
 Orcus bilunulatus (Boisduval, 1835) (Australia)
 Orcus biroi Weise, 1902 (New Guinea)
 Orcus chujoi Bielawski, 1962 (New Caledonia)
 Orcus cinctus Weise, 1902 (New Guinea)
 Orcus citri Lea, 1902 (Australia)
 Orcus cordiformis sp. nov. (New Guinea)
 Orcus cyancocephalus Mulsant, 1850 (Australia, New Guinea)
 Orcus janthinus Mulsant, 1850 (Java, Sumba, New Guinea)
 Orcus lafertei Mulsant, 1853 (Australia)
 Orcus nigricollis Weise, 1902 (Key Islands, New Guinea)
 Orcus nummularis (Boisduval, 1835) (Australia)
 Orcus obscurus Blackburn, 1892 (Australia)
 Orcus punctulatus Blackburn, 1892 (Australia, New Guinea)
 Orcus quadrimaculatus Gadeau de Kerville, 1884 (Australia)
 Orcus tetrafasciatus Laczynski, 2009 (New Guinea)
 Orcus viridulus Laczynski, 2009 (New Guinea)

References

Further reading

 
 

Coccinellidae

Coccinellidae genera